Mocra is a commune in the Rîbnița District of Transnistria, Moldova. It is composed of four villages: Basarabca (Бессарабка), Mocra, Șevcenco (Шевченко) and Zaporojeț (Запорожець, Запорожец). It has since 1990 been administered as a part of the self-proclaimed Pridnestrovian Moldavian Republic (PMR).

Notable people
 Eugen Doga

References

Communes of Transnistria
Bratslav Voivodeship
Baltsky Uyezd
Rîbnița District